Veikko Johannes Hakulinen (4 January 1925 – 24 October 2003) was a Finnish cross-country skier, triple champion in both the Olympics and World Championships. He also competed in biathlon, orienteering, ski-orienteering, cross-country running, and rowing at a national level.

Biography

Hakulinen won the 50 km event at the 1952 Winter Olympics with a memorable time of 3:33.33. Finland also won the 4 × 10 km relay, but Hakulinen was not on the team. Hakulinen was part of the Finland's winning relay team in the 1960 Winter Olympics, and won the 30 km gold in the 1956 Olympics. At his fourth games in 1964 he served as the Finnish Olympic flag bearer and competed only in biathlon.
 
In Finland, Hakulinen was chosen as sports personality of the year in 1952–1954 and 1960. He was decorated with the Pro Urheilu letter of recognition 2000.

Hakulinen also won the 50 km at the Holmenkollen ski festival twice (1953 and 1955), the 18 km (1953) and the 15 km (1957). For his efforts in cross-country skiing, Hakulinen was awarded the Holmenkollen medal in 1955 (shared with King Haakon VII, Hallgeir Brenden, and Sverre Stenersen).

Hakulinen was a forester by profession and held the rank of sergeant in the Finnish Army. He died in Valkeakoski in a car accident on 24 October 2003.

Cross-country skiing results
All results are sourced from the International Ski Federation (FIS).

Olympic Games
 7 medals – (3 gold, 3 silver, 1 bronze)

World Championships
 7 medals – (3 gold, 3 silver, 1 bronze)

Biathlon results 
 World championships, Seefeld 1963 – silver (team competition), sixth (20 km)
 Olympics, Innsbruck 1964 – 15th (20 km) 
 World championships, Elverum 1965 – fifth (team competition), 31st (20 km)

Bibliography 
 Hakulinen, Veikko. Haku-Veikko, suurhiihtäjä Veikko Hakulisen muistelmat 1999 (an autobiography)
 Kolkka, Sulo. Veikko Hakulinen, latujen valtias 1960 (biography)

References

External links

 
  – click Holmenkollmedaljen for downloadable pdf file 
  – click Vinnere for downloadable pdf file 
 
 

1925 births
2003 deaths
People from Lakhdenpokhsky District
Olympic cross-country skiers of Finland
Olympic biathletes of Finland
Cross-country skiers at the 1952 Winter Olympics
Cross-country skiers at the 1956 Winter Olympics
Cross-country skiers at the 1960 Winter Olympics
Biathletes at the 1964 Winter Olympics
Finnish male biathletes
Finnish male cross-country skiers
Holmenkollen medalists
Holmenkollen Ski Festival winners
Olympic gold medalists for Finland
Road incident deaths in Finland
Olympic medalists in cross-country skiing
Biathlon World Championships medalists
FIS Nordic World Ski Championships medalists in cross-country skiing
Medalists at the 1952 Winter Olympics
Medalists at the 1956 Winter Olympics
Medalists at the 1960 Winter Olympics
Finnish foresters
Olympic silver medalists for Finland
Olympic bronze medalists for Finland